Triarchy, synonym for triumvirate, is a political regime ruled or dominated by three powerful individuals.

Triarchy may also refer to:

 Triarchy (theory), a proposition that there are three fundamental ways of getting things done in organisations: hierarchy, heterarchy and responsible autonomy
Triarchy of Negroponte, a crusader state established on the island of Euboea

See also
 Triarchy of the Lost Lovers, an album by Rotting Christ
Triarchic theory of intelligence